The Volkswagen Taigo is a subcompact crossover SUV (B-segment) with a sloping roofline manufactured by the German automaker Volkswagen. Based on the Mk6 Polo, the Taigo is built on the Volkswagen Group MQB A0 platform.

The vehicle was first released as the Volkswagen Nivus, which was unveiled in May 2020 in Brazil. It has been launched in other South American markets in 2021, and was released in Europe in July 2021 as the Taigo. It is positioned alongside the T-Cross in the European market, and below the T-Cross in South America.

Overview 
Based on the Volkswagen Group MQB A0 platform, the Taigo/Nivus is closely related with the Mk6 Polo, sharing its side doors, windshield, roof stamping, suspension setup and most interior parts for efficiency and cost-cutting measures. While its fascia is completely redesigned, Volkswagen has also raised the hood which results in a taller presence and give it a more rugged look compared to the Polo. A completely new C-column stamping and the rear parts of the car allows for a larger trunk space, from 300 litres in the Polo to 415 litres. As the result, unlike other subcompact crossovers in the market, the Taigo/Nivus has a low-roof proportion that allows it to be marketed as a "coupe crossover" alternative to the tall-proportioned T-Cross. All-wheel drive is not available in any markets, as the MQB A0 platform did not support it.

The Taigo/Nivus is the first Volkswagen model developed in Brazil that is produced and sold in the European market. While the Nivus built in Brazil will be exported to markets in Latin America, the crossover went on production in the second half of 2021 in Pamplona, Spain as the Taigo.

According to Volkswagen do Brasil, about 30 people from the Spanish team were involved in the Taigo/Nivus project and some of them visited the facilities in Brazil to learn about the development vehicle before European production begins. Volkswagen claimed Taigo/Nivus was developed without any physical prototype needed, with designers and engineers using virtual reality and augmented reality instead. As a result, project time was reduced by 10 months with significant cost savings.

Taigo 
The Taigo was released for the European market on 28 July 2021, a year after the debut of the Nivus. Manufactured at the Pamplona plant in Spain alongside the Polo and T-Cross, its design has largely carried over from the South American Nivus with several minor changes. An R-Line variant is available as the flagship model. VW stated that it is the "first SUV coupe to be launched in the (European) small car segment". The sleek roofline comes at the expense of boot space as the Taigo has a capacity of 438 litres, compared to 455 litres for the European T-Cross.

The  unit is paired to a standard 5-speed manual, with the  engine offering a choice of a six-speed manual or a seven-speed DSG dual clutch transmission.

Nivus 
Debuted on 28 May 2020 in Brazil, the Nivus is the second vehicle by VW to occupy the segment after the T-Cross. It is built at the Anchieta plant in São Bernardo do Campo, Brazil alongside the Polo and Virtus, with all three models sharing the MQB A0 platform. Badged 200 TSI, the unit runs also on ethanol, in which case it makes . The engine is hooked to a six-speed automatic transmission and front-wheel drive.

An export-only option is the 170 TSI, with a 95hp version of the same engine backed by a 5-speed manual transmission, available in countries such as Argentina and Uruguay where manual transmission remains more appreciated than in Brazil.

In the interior, the Nivus shared the same dashboard with the European Polo, with minimal differences, making it to look slightly different from the Latin American Polo. The infotainment system featured VW Play, which is a multimedia interface fully developed in Brazil.

The Nivus was released in Mexico in December 2021, being imported from Brazil.

Powertrain

Sales

Safety 
Rear disc brakes are optional in the Nivus.

Latin NCAP
The Latin American Nivus with 6 airbags, airbag switch, UN127, ESC, ISA, full SBR and optional collision avoidance system received 5 stars from Latin NCAP in 2022 under its new protocol (similar to Euro NCAP 2014).

Euro NCAP
The Taigo was tested by Euro NCAP in 2022 as a partner model to the Polo and achieved the maximum five-star safety rating.

References

External links 

 Official website (Brazil)

Nivus
Cars introduced in 2020
Mini sport utility vehicles
Crossover sport utility vehicles
Front-wheel-drive vehicles
Euro NCAP small off-road
Cars of Brazil